"Every Time" is a song recorded by American country music artist Pam Tillis.  It was released in September 1998 as the second single and title track from the album Every Time.  The song reached #38 on the Billboard Hot Country Singles & Tracks chart.  The song was written by Jennifer Kimball and Tommy Lee James.

Chart performance

References

1998 singles
1998 songs
Pam Tillis songs
Songs written by Tommy Lee James
Songs written by Jennifer Kimball
Song recordings produced by Billy Joe Walker Jr.
Arista Nashville singles